Sharon Hill station is a SEPTA Route 102 trolley stop in Sharon Hill, Pennsylvania. The terminus of Route 102, the single track ends where it meets Chester Pike (US 13). Trolleys arriving at this station originate from 69th Street Terminal in Upper Darby, Pennsylvania. The station has a shed with a roof where people can go inside when it is raining. It is also about a half-mile walking distance of the Sharon Hill Regional Rail station which serves the Wilmington/Newark Line (formerly R2). However, due to the narrow nature of the neighborhoods and the overall distance, no direct connection exists between the two stations.

Though Sharon Hill is the terminus of the line, CSX's Philadelphia Subdivision freight line bridge crosses over the tracks between here and MacDade Boulevard station, resulting in the large dip upon entering the station from the north. Flooding often occurs in the underpass and as a result, shuttle buses between the two stations are used as substitutes for trolley cars.

Station layout

References

External links

 Shelter from Google Maps Street View

SEPTA Media–Sharon Hill Line stations